George N. Moore (born ca. 1844) was an early photographer in the Pacific Northwest. The University of Washington libraries have 35 of his prints in their collection.

Moore was born in Massachusetts ca. 1844.

Moore opened a studio in Seattle in 1870 specializing in portraits and offered colored tinting with crayons and water colors. He produced carte de visite and cabinet photographs. Thomas Prosch collected photos by Moore and other local photographers.

He photographed several community leaders from the "pioneer days" of Seattle including Seattle Post-Intelligencer publisher Charles Prosch, Judge Thomas Burke, and Father Prefontaine. He also photographed Pat Kanim (a "Puget Sound Indian" who was Snoqualmie chief) and Erasmus M. Smithers. He also photographed Roger Sherman Greene.

References

1844 births
Date of birth missing
Date of death missing
Place of death missing
19th-century American photographers
Photographers from Massachusetts
American portrait photographers